The 2019 Thai League Cup is the 10th season in the second era of a Thailand's knockout football competition. All games are played as a single match. It was sponsored by Toyota, and known as the Toyota League Cup for sponsorship purposes. 83 clubs were accepted into the tournament, and it began with the first qualification round on 23 February 2019, and concluded with the final on 28 September 2019. The tournament has been readmitted back into Thai football after a 10-year absence. The prize money for this prestigious award is said to be around 5 million baht and the runners-up will be netting 1 million baht.

This is the first edition of the competition and the qualifying round will be played in regions featuring clubs from the Thai League 3 and Thai League 4.

PT Prachuap beat Buriram United after draw 1–1 on the extra time and won 8–7 on penalty shoot-out. It is the first ever penalty shoot-out in the final round of this tournament. This is first time champion for PT Prachuap.

Calendar

Results
Note: T1: Clubs from Thai League 1; T2: Clubs from Thai League 2; T3: Clubs from Thai League 3; T4: Clubs from Thai League 4.

First qualification round
There were 19 clubs from 2019 Thai League 3 and 23 clubs from 2019 Thai League 4 have signed to first qualifying in 2019 Thai League cup. This round had drawn on 14 February 2019.

Northern region
The qualifying round would be played in northern region featuring 5 clubs from the 2019 Thai League 4 Northern Region and 3 clubs from the 2019 Thai League 3 Upper Region.

Northeastern region
The qualifying round would be played in northeastern region featuring 4 clubs from the 2019 Thai League 4 Northeastern Region and 2 clubs from the 2019 Thai League 3 Upper Region.

Eastern region
The qualifying round would be played in eastern region featuring 4 clubs from the 2019 Thai League 4 Eastern Region and 2 clubs from the 2019 Thai League 3 Upper Region.

Western region
The qualifying round would be played in western region featuring 3 clubs from the 2019 Thai League 4 Western Region, 2 clubs from 2019 Thai League 3 Upper Region, and 1 club from the 2019 Thai League 3 Lower Region.

Bangkok metropolitan region
The qualifying round would be played in Bangkok metropolitan region featuring 2 clubs from the 2019 Thai League 4 Bangkok Metropolitan Region, 1 club from 2019 Thai League 3 Upper Region, and 3 clubs from the 2019 Thai League 3 Lower Region.

Southern region
The qualifying round would be played in southern region featuring 7 clubs from the 2019 Thai League 4 Southern Region and 5 clubs from the 2019 Thai League 3 Lower Region.

Second qualification round
The second qualifying round would be featured by 21 clubs which were the winners of first qualification round and the new entries including 2 clubs from 2019 Thai League 3 and 5 clubs from 2019 Thai League 4.

Northern region
The second qualifying round would be played in northern region featured by 3 clubs which were the winners of first qualification round, 2 clubs from the 2019 Thai League 4 Northern Region, and 1 club from the 2019 Thai League 3 Upper Region.

Northeastern region
The second qualifying round would be played in northeastern region featured by 3 clubs which were the winners of first qualification round and 1 club from the 2019 Thai League 4 Northeastern Region.

Eastern region
The second qualifying round would be played in eastern region featured by 3 clubs which were the winners of first qualification round and 1 club from the 2019 Thai League 4 Eastern Region.

Western region
The second qualifying round would be played in western region featured by 3 clubs which were the winners of first qualification round and 1 club from the 2019 Thai League 3 Upper Region.

Bangkok metropolitan region
The second qualifying round would be played in Bangkok metropolitan region featured by 3 clubs which were the winners of first qualification round and 1 club from the 2019 Thai League 4 Bangkok Metropolitan Region.

Southern region
The second qualifying round would be played in southern region featured by 6 clubs which were the winners of first qualification round.

Qualification play-off round
The qualification play-off round would be featured by 14 clubs which were the winners of second qualification round and the new entries including 18 clubs from 2019 Thai League 2. Follow the dissolving of Simork that make a club drawing against them would advanced to next round automatically. This round had drawn on 11 April 2019.

First round
The first round would be featured by 16 clubs which were the winners of the qualification play-off round and the new entries including 16 clubs from 2019 Thai League 1. This round had drawn on 7 May 2019.

Second round
The second round would be featured by 16 clubs which were the winners of the first round including 7 clubs from T1, 5 clubs from T2, 1 club from T3, and 3 clubs from T4. This round had drawn on 11 June 2019.

Quarter-finals
The quarter-finals round would be featured by 8 clubs which were the winners of the second round including 4 clubs from T1, 3 clubs from T2, and 1 club from T3. This round had drawn on 8 July 2019.

Semi-finals
The semi-finals round would be featured by 4 clubs which were the winners of the quarter-finals round including 3 clubs from T1 and 1 club from T2. This round had drawn on 30 July 2019.

Final

The final round would be featured by 2 clubs which were the winners of the semi-finals round, both were clubs from T1. This round was played on 28 September 2019 at SCG Stadium in Pak Kret, Nonthaburi.

Top goalscorers

References

External links
 Thai League official website
 Toyota League Cup official Facebook page

2019 in Thai football cups
Thailand League Cup
2019
2019